Pterolophia kyushuensis is a species of beetle in the family Cerambycidae. It was described by Takakuwa in 1988.

References

kyushuensis
Beetles described in 1988